Francis William Lawvere (February 9, 1937 – January 23, 2023) was an American mathematician known for his work in category theory, topos theory and the philosophy of mathematics.

Biography
Lawvere studied continuum mechanics as an undergraduate with Clifford Truesdell. He learned of category theory while teaching a course on functional analysis for Truesdell, specifically from a problem in John L. Kelley's textbook General Topology. Lawvere found it a promising framework for simple rigorous axioms for the physical ideas of Truesdell and Walter Noll. Truesdell supported Lawvere's application to study further with Samuel Eilenberg, a founder of category theory, at Columbia University in 1960.

Before completing the Ph.D. Lawvere spent a year in Berkeley as an informal student of model theory and set theory, following lectures by Alfred Tarski and Dana Scott. In his first teaching position at Reed College he was instructed to devise courses in calculus and abstract algebra from a foundational perspective. He tried to use the then current axiomatic set theory but found it unworkable for undergraduates, so he instead developed the first axioms for the more relevant composition of mappings of sets. He later streamlined those axioms into the Elementary Theory of the Category of Sets (1964) 
(Reprints, #11), which became an ingredient (the constant case) of elementary topos theory.

Lawvere died on January 23, 2023, at the age of 85.

Work
Lawvere completed his Ph.D at Columbia in 1963 with Eilenberg. His dissertation introduced the Category of Categories as a framework for the semantics of algebraic theories. During 1964–1967 at the Forschungsinstitut für Mathematik at the ETH in Zürich he worked on the Category of Categories and was especially influenced by Pierre Gabriel's seminars at Oberwolfach on Grothendieck's foundation of algebraic geometry. He then taught at the University of Chicago, working with Mac Lane, and at the City University of New York Graduate Center (CUNY), working with Alex Heller.  His Chicago lectures on categorical dynamics were a further step toward topos theory and his CUNY lectures on hyperdoctrines advanced categorical logic especially using his 1963 discovery that existential and universal quantifiers can be characterized as special cases of adjoint functors.

Back in Zürich for 1968–69 he proposed elementary (first-order) axioms for toposes generalizing the concept of the Grothendieck topos (see history of topos theory) and worked with the algebraic topologist Myles Tierney to clarify and apply this theory. Tierney discovered major simplifications in the description of Grothendieck "topologies". Anders Kock later found further simplifications so that a topos can be described as a category with products and equalizers in which the notions of map space and subobject are representable. Lawvere had pointed out that a Grothendieck topology can be entirely described as an endomorphism of the subobject representor, and Tierney showed that the conditions it needs to satisfy are just idempotence and the preservation of finite intersections. These "topologies" are important in both algebraic geometry and model theory because they determine the subtoposes as sheaf-categories.

Dalhousie University in 1969 set up a group of 15 Killam-supported researchers with Lawvere at the head; but in 1971 it terminated the group. Lawvere was controversial for his political opinions, for example, his opposition to the 1970 use of the War Measures Act, and for teaching the history of mathematics without permission. But in 1995 Dalhousie hosted the celebration of 50 years of category theory with Lawvere and Saunders Mac Lane present.

Lawvere ran a seminar in Perugia, Italy (1972–1974) and especially worked on various kinds of enriched category.  For example, a metric space can be regarded as an enriched category. From 1974 until his retirement in 2000 he was professor of mathematics at University at Buffalo, often collaborating with Stephen Schanuel. In 1977 he was elected to the Martin professorship in mathematics for five years, which made possible the meeting on "Categories in Continuum Physics" in 1982. Clifford Truesdell participated in that meeting, as did several other researchers in the rational foundations of continuum physics and in the synthetic differential geometry that had evolved from the spatial part of Lawvere's categorical dynamics program. Lawvere continued to work on his 50-year quest for a rigorous flexible base for physical ideas, free of unnecessary analytic complications. He was professor emeritus of mathematics and adjunct professor emeritus of philosophy at Buffalo.

Awards and honors
 In 2010 he received the "Premio Giulio Preti", awarded by the Regional Council of Tuscany
 In 2012 he became a fellow of the American Mathematical Society.

Selected books
 1986 Categories in Continuum Physics (Buffalo, N.Y. 1982), edited by Lawvere and Stephen H. Schanuel (with Introduction by Lawvere pp 1–16), Springer Lecture Notes in Mathematics 1174. ; ebook
 2003 (2002) Sets for Mathematics (with Robert Rosebrugh). Cambridge Uni. Press. 
 2009 Conceptual Mathematics: A First Introduction to Categories (with Stephen H. Schanuel). Cambridge University Press, 2nd ed. ; 1997 pbk edition

See also
Lawvere–Tierney topology

References

External links
 A 2007 interview published on the Bulletin of the International Center for Mathematics of Coimbra, Portugal (Part I , Part II; both parts in one file)
 Reprints in Theory and Applications of Categories. Includes reprints of eight of Lawvere's fundamental articles, among them his dissertation and his first full treatment of the category of sets.  Those two had circulated only as mimeographs.
 Homepage. Includes bibliography and downloadable papers, Ph.D. thesis.
 
 Photograph

1937 births
2023 deaths
20th-century American mathematicians
21st-century American mathematicians
Category theorists
University of California, Berkeley alumni
University at Buffalo faculty
University of Chicago faculty
Columbia University alumni
Fellows of the American Mathematical Society
Philosophers of mathematics
20th-century American philosophers
21st-century American philosophers
People from Muncie, Indiana